The Australian Football League celebrates the best mark of the season through the annual Mark of the Year competition. In 2011, this was officially known as the Hungry Jack's AFL Mark of the Year.  Each round three marks were nominated and fans voted online for their favourite here . Andrew Krakouer won the fan vote for 2011 Mark of the Year. The AFL itself later recognised that this was not the best mark taken in 2011, when in 2019 it awarded Mark of the Decade to Andrew Walker's Round 18 mark.

Winners by Round
Legend

2011 Finalists

See also
 Mark of the Year
 Goal of the Year
 2011 AFL Goal of the Year
 2011 AFL season

Mark of the Year
Australian rules football-related lists